Hakuyo Maru (Japanese: 白鷹丸) was a Japanese cargo ship of during World War II.

History
She was laid down in 1944 at the Osaka shipyard of Namura Shipbuilding Co., Ltd. (jp:名村造船所), for the benefit of Toyo Kisen Kaisha Co., Ltd. (jp:東洋汽船), Tokyo. She was one of 92 Wartime Standard Type D Cargo Ships laid down in 1944–1945 and one of nine built by Namura Shipbuilding, seven of which were completed prior to the end of the war. Other Type D cargo ships built by Namura were Noto Maru (能登丸), Kaga Maru (加賀丸), Shinei Maru No.3 (第三神影丸), Echizen Maru (越前丸), Himi Maru (日見丸), Goshun Maru (五春丸), Nansei Maru (南征丸), and Nanyo Maru (南陽丸). She was launched on 9 September 1944 and completed on 6 October 1944. On 12 June 1945, she was lost in a maritime incident in dense fog in the Tsugaru Strait.

References

1944 ships
Ships built in Japan
Maritime incidents in June 1945